Barry Hogan is an Irish hurler who plays for Kiladangan and at inter-county level with the Tipperary senior hurling team. He usually lines out as a goalkeeper.

Career
Hogan made his senior debut for Tipperary on 8 May 2021 in the opening round of the 2021 National Hurling League in a 0-20 to 0-20 draw with Limerick.
He made his championship debut on 4 July 2021 in a 3-22 to 2-21 win against Clare in the Munster semi-final.

Honours

Team

Tipperary
All-Ireland Under-21 Hurling Championship (2): 2018, 2019
Munster Under-21 Hurling Championship (1): 2019
All-Ireland Minor Hurling Championship (1): 2016 
Munster Minor Hurling Championship (1):2016

Kiladangan
Tipperary Senior Hurling Championship (1): 2020
North Tipperary Senior Hurling Championship (3): 2015, 2016, 2019

References

Living people
Tipperary inter-county hurlers
Hurling goalkeepers
Year of birth missing (living people)